Robert Harris (born 24 September 1944) is a Canadian Catholic bishop. Since 2007 he has served as the head of the Roman Catholic Diocese of Saint John, New Brunswick. Harris is pastor of the Cathedral of the Immaculate Conception in Saint John, New Brunswick. He resigned in 2019 when he reached the mandatory retirement age of 75 years.

Born in Montreal, Quebec, he was ordained a priest in 1969. From 2002 to 2007, he was the Auxiliary Bishop of Sault Ste. Marie. In 2007, he was installed as the twelfth Bishop of Roman Catholic Diocese of Saint John, New Brunswick. As bishop, he was the chancellor of St. Thomas University in Fredericton, New Brunswick. The diocese's liberal arts university.

References
 

Living people
21st-century Roman Catholic bishops in Canada
1944 births
Clergy from Montreal
Roman Catholic bishops of Sault Sainte Marie, Ontario
Roman Catholic bishops of Saint John, New Brunswick